This is a list of notable Georgians.

Leaders and politicians
 Pharnavaz I, King of Iberia from 302 to 237 BC
 Vakhtang I Gorgasali, King of Iberia from 447/449–502/522
 David the Builder (1073–1125), King of Georgia from 1089 to 1125
 Tamar the Great (1160–1213), Queen of Georgia from 1184 to 1207/1213
 George V The Brilliant, King of Georgia from 1299 to 1302 and from 1314 to 1346
 Heraclius II, King of Kartli-Kakheti from 1762 to 1798
 Joseph Stalin (1878-1953), Soviet dictator from 1922 to 1952
 Zviad Gamsakhurdia (1939–1993), first President of Republic of Georgia from 1991 to 1992
 Eduard Shevardnadze (1927–2014), Foreign Minister of USSR and second President of Republic of Georgia from 1995 to 2003
 Mikheil Saakashvili, third president of Georgia from 2004 to 2013

Parliamentarians

 Mamuka Chikovani, Member of the United National Movement from 2016 to 2020

Military figures

Throughout history, there were many notorious Georgian military figures and commanders serving in the Georgian, Turkish, Iranian, Spanish, Russian, Polish and other country's military forces from BC till today. There were around 100 high-ranking officers serving in the Polish army during World War II alone. Most prominent figures served in Russian, US and Persian armies.

(Incomplete list, see above categories for more)
 Grigol Bakurianis-dze (11th century), general in the Byzantine service
 Giorgi Saakadze (1570–1629), Georgian, Safavid and Ottoman military commander who won many battles against Muslim coalition forces and also battles for the Ottoman and Safavid Empire; notorious for annihilating an Iranian army at the Battle of Martqopi in 1625 almost without own losses
 Allahverdi Khan (c. 1560 – June 3, 1613), Iranian general and statesman of Georgian origin who rose to high office in the Safavid state
 Imam-Quli Khan, Iranian military and political leader of Georgian origin who served as a governor of Fars, Lar and Bahrain for the shahs Abbas I and Safi
 Daud Khan Undiladze, Iranian military commander and politician of Georgian origin; governor (beglarbeg) of Ganja and Karabakh 1625–1630
 Rostom-Khan Saakadze (c. 1588 – 1 March 1643), Iranian Safavid military commander (sipah-salar) of Georgian origin
 Prince Alexander of Imereti (1674–1711), Georgian prince and commander of the artillery of the Russian Empire under Peter I
 Yusef Khan-e Gorji, Iranian military leader of Georgian origin
 Pyotr Bagration (1765–1812), one of the most prominent generals in Russian military history and most respected opponent of Napoleon; the Soviet counterattack against German forces in World War II was named after him, Operation Bagration
 Alexandre Bagrationi (1770–1844), Georgian prince and resistance fighter
 Roman Bagration (1778–1834), prominent general of the Imperial Russian army, distinguished commander in the Russo-Persian Wars and Napoleonic Wars
 Ivane Bagration of Mukhrani (1812–1895), major general of the Russian Empire; revolutionizer of the wine industry
 Ivane Amilakhvari (1829–1905), general of the Russian Empire and distinguished commander during the Crimean War and Russo-Turkish War
 Alexander Imeretinsky (1837–1900), Georgian-Russian prince; lieutenant general and hero of the Russo-Turkish War; became governor-general of Warsaw in 1897
 Ivane Kazbegi (1860–1943), major general of the Russian Empire, then major general of the Polish Army and strategist at the Polish Academy of Defence
 Kote Abkhazi (1867–1923), general of the Russian Empire and Georgian resistance fighter
 Zakaria Bakradze (1870–1938), brigadier general of the Polish army
 Giorgi Mazniashvili (1872–1937), general in Russian and Georgian service; defeated three enemy armies invading Georgia
 Giorgi Kvinitadze (1874–1970), Russian general and later commander-in-chief of the Democratic Republic of Georgia during the Red Army invasion of Georgia
 Joseph Stalin (1878–1953), leader of the Soviet Union
 Leo Kereselidze (1878–1942)
 Alexandre Chkheidze (1878–1940), general of the Polish army
 Valiko Jugheli (1887–1924), Georgian general and resistance fighter
 Kaikhosro (Kakutsa) Cholokashvili (1888–1930), Georgian resistance fighter
 Konstantin Mikeladze (1895–1935), commander in the Iranian army
 Grigor Mikeladze (1898–1955), first lieutenant in the Iranian army
 Shalva Maglakelidze (1893–1976), Georgian general and later in charge of the German Georgian Legion of (1941–1945)
 Pore Mosulishvili (1916–1944), Soviet soldier and partisan in the Italian resistance movement
 Valerian Tevzadze (1894–1987), colonel of the Polish army and resistance fighter in World War II, later against the Soviet rule until his death in 1987
 Lavrentiy Beria (1899–1953), marshal of the Soviet Union and main ideologist and architect, as well as chief of the Soviet secret police, NKVD
 Konstantin Leselidze (1903–1944), colonel general of the Soviet Union, commander of the Caucasus front and hero of the Soviet Union
 Dimitri Amilakhvari (1906–1942), colonel of the French Foreign Legion, fighting on almost every important spot during the war, hero of France and iconic figure of the French resistance during World War II
 Vladimir Janjgava (1907–1982), lieutenant general and hero of the Soviet Union
 Alexi Inauri (1908–1993), colonel general and hero of the Soviet Union
 Vasilij Shalvovich Kvachantiradze (1907–1950), Soviet sniper who scored 215-500 kills, hero of the Soviet Union
 Yaroslav Iosseliani (1912–1978), submarine commander, hero of the Soviet Union
 Archil Gelovani (1915–1978), marshal of the engineer troops
 Jerzy Tumaniszwili (1916–2010), counter admiral of the Polish navy
 Noe Adamia (1914–1942), Soviet sniper, hero of the Soviet Union
 Meliton Kantaria (1920–1993), sergeant of the Red Army who raised the Soviet victory banner over the Reichstag in Berlin, April 30, 1945
 Geno Adamia (1936–1993), Georgian major general and garrison commander of Sukhumi; executed with the entire garrison and extermination of the city's population by Abkhazian militia during the Sukhumi massacre
 John Shalikashvili (Poland, 1936–2011), general of the United States, chairman of the Joint Chiefs of Staff and supreme commander of NATO forces in Europe; partially solved Kurdish conflict on the Iraqi-Turkish border, saving around 500.000 Kurdish people being displaced; developed the Joint Vision 10 plan, a template which combined all elements of the United States armed forces to one efficient network of the different combat components

Religious leaders

 Saint Nino (c. 296 – c. 338 or 340), a woman from Cappadocia, heavily involved in the Christianization of Iberia
 Thirteen Assyrian Fathers, among them Abibos of Nekresi, Assyrian missionaries, said to have arrived from Mesopotamia in the 6th century. 
 Gregory of Khandzta (759–861), a prominent ecclesiastic figure, active in Tao-Klarjeti
 George of Chqondidi (died c. 1118), a churchman and court minister, advisor to David IV of Georgia
 Arsen of Iqalto (died c. 1127), a prominent churchman and scholar 
 Antim Iverianul (Antimoz Iverieli) (1650–1716), Metropolitan of Romania
 Nikoloz Cholokashvili (Niceforo Irbachi) (1585–1658), Orthodox priest
 Eudemus I of Georgia (died 1642), churchman serving as Catholicos-Patriarch of All Georgia from 1632 until his death in 1642.
 Anton II of Georgia (1762 or 1763–1827), member of the Bagrationi Dynasty and Catholicos-Patriarch of All Georgia from (1788 to 1811)
 Dositheus of Tbilisi (died 1795), Archbishop of Tbilisi and a martyr
 Peter Kharischirashvili (1804/05–1890), Catholic monk 
 Shio Batmanishvili (1885–1937), Catholic priest and martyr
 Michel Tamarati (1858–1911), Catholic priest
 Ambrosius (1861–1927), Catholicos-Patriarch of All Georgia from 1921 to 1927
 Grigol Peradze (1899–1942), Archimandrite, historian (Poland)
 Elie Melia (1915–1988), Orthodox priest and church historian
 Gabriel (1929–1995), Orthodox monk, venerated as Saint Gabriel, Confessor and Fool for Christ
 Ilia II (born 1932), Catholicos-Patriarch of All Georgia since 1977

Scholars

Medieval

 Peter the Iberian (c. 417 – 491), theologian and philosopher, one of the founders of Christian Neoplatonism 
 Martviri Sabatsmindeli 6th century, monk, calligrapher and writer at Mar Saba; foreman of Sabbas the Sanctified
 Basili Sabatsmindeli 8th century, monk, calligrapher and writer at Mar Saba 
 Makari of Leteti 9th century, calligrapher and scholar at Mar Saba 
 Mikaeli 9th century, calligrapher; known for Adysh Gospels
 Euthymius the Athonite  (c. 955–1024), monk, philosopher and scholar
 Gabrieli 10th century, calligrapher 
 Mikael Modrekili 10th century, calligrapher, poet, writer and scholar; best known for Iadgari of Mikael Modrekili
 Ioane Berai 10th century, calligrapher
 John Zosimus 10th century, monk, religious writer, and calligrapher; best known for his hymn "Praise and Exaltation of the Georgian Language." 
 Gabriel Patarai 10th century, calligrapher
 George the Hagiorite (1009–1065), monk, calligrapher and scholar at the Iviron Monastery
 Ioane Mesvete 11th century, calligrapher
 Mikael Mtserali 11th century, calligrapher
 Arsen Ninotsmindeli 11th century, bishop, scholar, translator and calligrapher at the Iviron Monastery
 Leonti Mroveli 11th century, chronicler, contributor to The Georgian Chronicles
 Juansher Juansheriani 11th century, historian, contributor to The Georgian Chronicles
 Sumbat Davitis Dze 11th century, chronicler, contributor to The Georgian Chronicles
 Ephrem Mtsire 11-12th century, monk, theologian and translator 
 Ioane Petritsi 11-12th century, Neoplatonist philosopher and translator
 Tbeli Abuserisdze (c. 1190 – 1240), scholard and religious writer
 Giorgi Dodisi 12th century, calligrapher at the Monastery of the Cross
 Nikrai 12-13th century, calligrapher
 Avgaroz Bandaisdze 14th century, calligrapher and painter
 Parsadan Gorgijanidze (1626 – c. 1696), historian and factotum
 Vakhushti Bagrationi (1696–1757), historian and geographer
 Mamuka Tavakalashvili 17th century, calligrapher, painter and poet
 David the Rector (1745–1824), pedagogue and calligrapher
 Teimuraz Bagrationi (1782–1846), historian and philologist

Modern

 Platon Ioseliani (1810–1875), historian and civil servant
 David Chubinashvili (1814–1891), lexicographer, linguist, scholar of old Georgian literature. 
 Mikhail Sabinin (1845–1900), monk and historian
 Nikolai Marr (1864–1934), historian and linguist; known for the pseudo-scientific Japhetic theory 
 Kita Chkhenkeli (1865–1963), linguist and lexicographer
 Nikoloz Muskhelishvili (1891–1976), mathematician, physicist and engineer
 Michael Gregor (1888–1953), aircraft engineer
 Ilia Abuladze (1901–1968), philologist
 Georgy Beriev (1903–1979), Soviet major general, engineer, founder of the Beriev Aircraft Company
 Wachtang Djobadze (1917–2007), professor and art historian
 Malkhaz Abdushelishvili (1926–1998), anthropologist
 Hélène Carrère d'Encausse (born 1927), political historian, Perpetual Secretary of the Académie Française
 David Devdariani (1927–2006), professor of Jurisprudence
 Georges Charachidzé (1930–2010), scholar of Caucasian Studies
 Gaston Bouatchidzé (born 1935), professor, translator and writer
 Giuli Alasania (born 1946), historian
 Andria Apakidze (1914–2005), archaeologist
 Tornike Gordadze (born 1975), political scientist
 Manana Kochladze (born 1972), biologist and environmentalist
 François Zourabichvili (1965–2006), philosopher
 Zurab Avalishvili (1876–1944), international law and history
 Dimitri Bakradze (1826–1890), historian
 Ivan Beritashvili (1884–1974), physiologist
 Levan Chilashvili (1930–2004), archaeologist
 Alexander Nikuradse (1900–1981), physicist and Nazi political scientist
 Johann Nikuradse (1894–1979), engineer and physicist
 Michael Achmeteli (1895–1963), agronomist, sometime chief of the Wannsee Institut
 Juansher Chkareuli (born 1940), physicist
 Giorgi Chubinashvili (1885–1973), art historian
 Gia Dvali (born 1964), physicist
 Solomon Dodashvili (1805–1836), philosopher
 Revaz Dogonadze (1931–1985), physicist
 Revaz Gabashvili  (1878–1959), historian
 Tamaz Gamkrelidze (born 1928), linguist, President of the Academy of Sciences
 Vladimir Gigauri (1934–2006), scientist
 Olga Guramishvili-Nikoladze (1855–1940), educator
 Guranda Gvaladze (1932-2020), botanist
 Pavle Ingorokva (1893–1990), historian and philologist
 Nikoloz Janashia (1931–1982), historian
 Simon Janashia (1900–1947), historian
 Ivane Javakhishvili (1876–1940), historian
 Joseph Jordania (born 1954), ethnomusicologist and evolutionary musicologist (Australia)
 Sargis Kakabadze (1886–1967), historian
 Alexander Kartveli (1896–1974), aircraft engineer (United States)
 Giorgi Kartvelishvili (1827–1901), public figure, benefactor
 Simon Kaukhchishvili (1895–1981), historian and philologist
 Valentin Kontridze (1933-2002), ophthalmologist and eye microsurgeon
 David Lordkipanidze (born 1963), anthropologist
 Givi Maisuradze (born 1934), geologist
 Merab Mamardashvili (1930–1990), philosopher
 Guram Mchedlidze (born 1931), biologist
 Giorgi Melikishvili (1918–2002), historian
 Roin Metreveli  (born 1939), historian
 Alexander Nadiradze (1914–1987), missile engineer (USSR)
 Shalva Nutsubidze (1888–1969), philosopher
 Akaki Shanidze (1887–1987), linguist and philologist
 Ekvtime Takaishvili (1863–1953), historian and archaeologist
 Giorgi Tsereteli (1904–1973), linguist
 Grigol Tsereteli (1870–1938), philologist
 Mikheil Tsereteli (1878–1965), sumerologist
 Vasil Tsereteli (1862–1937), physician and public benefactor
 Dimitri Uznadze (1886–1950), psychologist and philosopher
 Ilia Vekua (1907–1977), mathematician

Cultural figures

Actors
 Leila Abashidze
 Veriko Anjaparidze
 Medea Chakhava
 Sofiko Chiaureli
 Ramaz Chkhikvadze
 Mariam Garikhuli (1883–1960)
 Kakhi Kavsadze
 Vakhtang Kikabidze
 Zurab Kipshidze
 Otar Koberidze
 Avtandil Makharadze
 Kote Makharadze
 Giorgi Nakashidze 
 Merab Ninidze
 Guram Sagaradze
 Karlo Sakandelidze
 Nato Vachnadze
 Bukhuti Zakariadze
 Sergo Zakariadze

Architects
 Simon Kldiashvili
 Victor Djorbenadze
 Vazha Orbeladze
 Shota Kavlashvili
 Giuli Gegelia 
 George Chakhava 
 Giorgi Khmaladze

Artists
 Iago Dekanozishvili
 Georgi Aleksi-Meskhishvili
 Irakli Gamrekeli
 Valerian Sidamon-Eristavi
 Dimitri Tavadze
 Simon Virsaladze
 Mirian Shvelidze

Ballet dancers

 Nino Ananiashvili
 George Balanchine (1904–1983), US choreographer; founder of school of American ballet
 Vakhtang Chabukiani
 Irma Nioradze
 Nikolai Tsiskaridze

Composers

 Rostom Aramovic Alagian
 Dimitri Arakishvili
 Andria Balanchivadze
 Meliton Balanchivadze
 Alexandre Basilaia
 Ioseb Bardanashvili
 Alexander Borodin
 Otar Gordeli
 Maka Maya Virsaladze
 Vakhtang Kakhidze
 Giya Kancheli (1935–2019)
 Bidzina Kvernadze
 Mikheil Kobakhidze
 Ioseb Kechakmadze
 Mindia Khitarishvili
 Aleksandre Machavariani
 Vakhtang Machavariani
 Nikoloz Memanishvili 
 Konstantin Meladze 
 Vano Muradeli 
 Zurab Nadarejshvili
 Koka Nikoladze
 Zakaria Paliashvili
 Otar Taktakishvili
 Sulkhan Tsintsadze
 Victor Dolidze (composer)
 Natela Svanidze 
 Givi Gachechiladze

Conductors 
 Jemal Gokieli
 Vakhtang Jordania
 Jansug Kakhidze
 Vakhtang Kakhidze
 Evgeni Mikeladze

Designers
 Keto Mikeladze
 Irene Galitzine
 Irakli Nasidze
 Aka Nanitashvili
 Tatuna Nikolaishvili
 Lako Bukia
 David Koma
 Ria Keburia
 Ekaterine Abuladze
 Anouki (designer)
 Avtandil (designer)
 Teona Gardapkhadze
 Irina Shabayeva
 Demna Gvasalia

Folk musicians
 Ensemble Erisioni
 Ensemble Georgika
 Ensemble Rustavi
 Hamlet Gonashvili
 Sukhishvili National Ballet

Filmmakers

 Vasil Amashukeli
 Mikhail Kalatozov
 Dodo Abashidze
 Tengiz Abuladze
 Temur Babluani
 Mikheil Chiaureli
 Goderdzi Chokheli
 Georgi Daneliya
 Sergi Gvarjaladze
 Levan Gabriadze (born 1969)
 Otar Ioseliani
 Marlen Khutsiev (Khutsishvili)
 Giorgi Shengelaia
 Eldar Shengelaia
 Dito Tsintsadze

Opera singers
 Paata Burchuladze
 Lamara Chkonia
 Stella Grigorian
 Tamar Iveri
 Makvala Kasrashvili
 Nino Machaidze
 Badri Maisuradze
 Natela Nicoli
 Anita Rachvelishvili
 Zurab Sotkilava
 Nino Surguladze
 Tsisana Tatishvili

Painters

 Merab Abramishvili
 Elene Akhvlediani
 David Alexidze
 Pyotr Nikolayevich Gruzinsky
 Gia Bugadze
 Gigo Gabashvili
 Lado Gudiashvili
 Elene Akhvlediani
 Hasan Helimishi
 Gia Gugushvili
 Dimitri Shevardnadze
 Aliquli Jabbadar 
 Mamuka Japharidze
 David Kakabadze
 Shalva Kikodze
 Sergo Kobuladze
 Apollon Kutateladze 
 Guram Kutateladze
 Levan Mindiashvili
 Petre Otskheli
 Irakli Parjiani
 Rusudan Petviashvili
 Niko Pirosmani
 Oleg Timchenko
 Radish Tordia
 Georgy Konstantinovich Totibadze
 Avto Varazi
 Ekaterine Abuladze
 Levan Songulashvili

Pianists
 Tengiz Amirejibi
 Eteri Andjaparidze
 Khatia Buniatishvili
 Marina Goglidze-Mdivani
 Inga Kashakashvili
 Alexander Korsantia
 Giorgi Latso
 Tamriko Siprashvili
 Irma Svanadze 
 Alexander Toradze 
 Eliso Virsaladze
 Eleonora Eksanishvili

Poets
 Alexander Abasheli
 Irakli Abashidze
 Rati Amaglobeli
 Lado Asatiani
 Nikoloz Baratashvili
 Besiki
 Alexander Chavchavadze
 Ilia Chavchavadze
 Zviad Gamsakhurdia
 Valerian Gaprindashvili
 David-Dephy Gogibedashvili
 Terenti Graneli
 Ioseb Grishashvili
 David Guramishvili
 Yetim Gurdji
 Paolo Iashvili
 Irakli Kakabadze
 Ana Kalandadze
 Giorgi Leonidze
 Mukhran Machavariani
 David Magradze
 Kolau Nadiradze
 Niko Nikoladze
 Vazha-Pshavela
 Shota Rustaveli
 Galaktion Tabidze
 Titsian Tabidze
 Akaki Tsereteli

Photographers
 Alexander Roinashvili (1846–1898)
 Antoin Sevruguin (1830–1933)
 Guram Tikanadze (1832–1863)
 Irakly Shanidze (born 1968)
 David Meskhi (born 1979)

Sculptors

 Iakob Nikoladze
 Irakli Ochiauri
 Zurab Tsereteli
 Elguja Amashukeli (1926–2002)
 Merab Berdzenishvili (1929–2016)
 Goudji (born 1941) also a goldsmith

Singers
 Irakli Charkviani
 Niaz Diasamidze
 Nino Katamadze
 Irma Sokhadze
 Katie Melua

Theatre producers

 Kote Marjanishvili
 Sandro Akhmeteli
 Valerian Gunia
 Revaz Gabriadze (1935–2021)
 Robert Sturua
 Andro Enukidze
 Vakhtang Mchedelov
 Mikheil Tumanishvili
 Manana Anasashvili
 Synetic Theater (Founded and ran by Paata and Irina Tsikurishvili)

Writers

 Kita Abashidze, literary critic
 Chabua Amirejibi
 Lado Asatiani (1917–1942), poet
 Ilia Chavchavadze (1837–1907), poet and writer
 Otar Chiladze
 Tamaz Chiladze
 Daniel Chonkadze
 Nino Dadeshkeliani (1890–1931), writer, politician
 Shalva Dadiani
 Guram Dochanashvili
 Nodar Dumbadze
 Konstantine Gamsakhurdia
 Iakob Gogebashvili
 Levan Gotua
 Mikheil Javakhishvili
 Aleksandre Kazbegi
 Babilina Khositashvili (1884–1973), poet, feminist
 Leo Kiacheli
 David Kldiashvili
 Mukhran Machavariani (born 1929), poet
 Ekaterine Melikishvili (1854–1928), translator, feminist
 Kato Mikeladze (1878–1942), journalist and feminist
 Aka Morchiladze
 George Papashvily
 Vazha-Pshavela (Luka Razikashvili) (1862–1915), poet and writer
 Guram Rcheulishvili
 Grigol Robakidze
 Shota Rustaveli (12th century), poet
 Galaktion Tabidze (1891–1953), poet
 David Turashvili
 Lasha Bughadze

Sportspeople
 Shota Arveladze (born 1973), former footballer
 Giorgi Asanidze (born 1975), Olympic and world champion weightlifter and politician
 Zurab Azmaiparashvili (born 1960), chess grandmaster
 Nikoloz Basilashvili (born 1992), tennis player, winner of 5 ATP titles and former nº 16 in the ATP rankings
 Maia Chiburdanidze (born 1961), Women's World Champion in chess (1978–1991)
 Natela Dzalamidze (born 1993), tennis player 
 Roman Dzindzichashvili (born 1944), US Chess Champion (1983 and 1989)
 Kokkai Futoshi (Levan Tsaguria) (born 1981), sumo wrestler
 Nona Gaprindashvili (born 1941), Women's World Champion in chess (1962–1978)
 Kakhi Kakhiashvili (born 1969), Olympic and world champion weightlifter 
 Kakhaber Kaladze (born 1978), footballer, Genoa and Georgia national team
 Khvicha Kvaratskhelia (born 2001), footballer, Napoli and Georgia national team
 Temuri Ketsbaia (born 1968), former footballer, notably for Newcastle United F.C. and Georgia national team
 Mikhail Khergiani (1932–1969), champion mountaineer
 Georgi Kinkladze (born 1973), former footballer
 Gagamaru Masaru (Teimuraz Jugheli) (born 1987), sumo wrestler
 Mevlud Meladze (born 1972), Formula Alfa champion
 Oganez Mkhitaryan (born 1962), football coach and former player
 Natalia Nasaridze (born 1972), champion archer
 Zaza Pachulia (born 1984), NBA basketball player
 Roman Rurua (born 1942), wrestler 
 Tornike Shengelia (born 1991), basketball player 
 Lasha Talakhadze (born 1993), Olympic and world champion weightlifter
 Gocha Tsitsiashvili (born 1973), Israeli Olympic wrestler
 Nikoloz Tskitishvili (born 1983), NBA basketball player
 Tochinoshin Tsuyoshi (Levan Gorgadze) (born 1987), sumo wrestler
 Dimitri Yachvili (born 1980), French former rugby union footballer
 Valerian Zirakadze (born 1978), former footballer
 Levan Saginashvili (born 1988), arm-wrestler
 Giga Chikadze (born 1988), mixed martial artist and former kickboxer

Businesspeople

 Sila Zandukeli-Sandunov (1756–1820), founder of the eponymous Sandunóvskie Baths
 David Sarajishvili (1848–1911), entrepreneur, philanthropist and scientist. Founder of Kizlyar Brandy Factory
 George Coby (1883–1967)
 Alex d'Arbeloff (1927–2008), co-founder of Teradyne
 Kakha Bendukidze (1956–2014), statesman, businessman and philanthropist
 Levan Gachechiladze (born 1964), founder of Georgian Wine Company, 2008 Georgian presidential candidate
 Tamir Sapir (1946/1947 – 2014), 
 David Gamkrelidze (born 1964), founder of Aldagi Insurance Company;Former Member of Parliament
 Bidzina (Boris) Ivanishvili (born 1956), politician, billionaire, businessman and philanthropist; Prime Minister of Georgia from October 2012 to November 2013.
 Badri Patarkatsishvili (1956–2008), business oligarch; richest Georgian businessman; 2008 Georgian presidential candidate
 Mamuka Khazaradze (born 1966), businessman and politician, founder of TBC Bank
 David Nikuradze (born 1975), journalist
 George Arison, (born 1977) founder and CEO of Shift

Other known Georgians
 Razhden Arsenidze (1880–1965), jurist, journalist, and politician
 Sopho Khalvashi (born 1986), songstress
 Nino Kipiani (1877–1920s), lawyer
 Zviad Kvachantiradze (born 1965), former Secretary General of TRACECA, ambassador
 The Mdivani family, aznauri, or minor nobility 
 Vasily Sopromadze (born 1963), property developer in Russia

See also
 Lists of people by nationality

References

External links

 Dictionary of Georgian National Biography

Georgians